This page presents the discography of French singer Sylvie Vartan.

Albums

Studio albums

Singles and EPs

1960s

1970s

1980s

1990s-present

References 

Discographies of French artists
Pop music discographies